"Evil Boy" is a song by South African hip hop group Die Antwoord featuring rapper Wanga. It was written by Tony Cottrell, Watkin Tudor Jones (Ninja), Justin De Nobrega, Hugo Pasquin, Thomas Wesley Pentz (Diplo), and Yolandi Visser, and was produced by Diplo. It was released by Interscope Records and it serves as the final single from their album $O$.

An extended version of the song titled "Evil Boy (F**k You In The Face Mix)" was digitally released as a single on 8 October 2010 in certain countries.

Background 
Diplo, who took an interest to Yo-Landi Vi$$er, contacted the group before sending them a beat which Ninja enjoyed, eventually collaborating on "Evil Boy".

Lyrical content 

The lyrics of the song discuss tribal circumcision. In an interview, Ninja described a particular ritual for males over 19 that involved having "your penis chopped up with a kitchen knife. No disinfectants; no pain killers."

Critical reception 
Complex complimented Diplo's "creeping synth hook that captures the group's silliness without turning them into a joke" and included the song on a list of Diplo's best productions.

A.R. Rowe of MTV wrote "No 'We Are the World' tracks for Die Antwoord. No Bono charities. These guys are taking some of the most unaddressed, difficult issues in the world, and sticking them right in your face without apology."

Music video 
The music video was directed by Ninja and Rob Malpage. It contains major influence from South African culture, sexuality, as well as mythology, such as the Tokoloshe. It features a cameo by producer Diplo.
The music sounds similar to a soundtrack of Alejandro Jodorowsky for the movie "Holy Mountain", a scene dedicated to the initiation of a young man, looking like Jesus, by the Tarot.

Reception 
Craig Hlavaty of the Houston Press said the video makes "Lady Gaga seem like Celine Dion" and warned "If you don't like random erections, wooden erections, talking breasts, breasts with no nipples, words that aren't English, mud, grime, gold lame pants, clean and strong peni, machetes, more erections, jackets made of rats, monsters with erections, questionable facial hair, and prostitution, don't watch this video."

As of March 2019, the video has over thirty million views on YouTube.

Track listing 
Digital download
"Evil Boy (F**k You In the Face Mix)" – 4:56

References

External links 
 

2010 singles
Song recordings produced by Diplo
2009 songs
Songs written by Diplo
Interscope Records singles
Songs written by Hi-Tek
Die Antwoord songs